Mehdi Hajati is an Iranian political activist who was a member of the Islamic City Council of Shiraz. He was also the chairman of the Citizens' Rights Commission and the vice chairman of the Budget and Planning Commission.

Arrest
In September, Hajati rose to nationwide prominence after he was arrested for speaking out against the arrests of two citizens of the Baháʼí Faith. His arrest lead to condemnation from inside and outside of Iran.

Hajati was released ten days after detention with a bail of US$47,500, he was banned from sitting on the Shiraz City Council and was placed under judicial supervision for six months.

References

Living people
Iranian reformists
1979 births
Iranian city councillors
People from Shiraz
Prisoners and detainees of Iran